Davistown is a south-eastern suburb of the Central Coast region of New South Wales, Australia. It is part of the  local government area.

The suburb is serviced by a small shopping centre, Paringa Mall, and the Davistown RSL.

It is populated mostly by young families and elderly retirees.

In recent years, much of the dilapidated housing in the area, built mostly within the 1950s through to the 1980s has undergone purchasing by wealthier individuals who are rebuilding new homes.

History

It is named for the Davis family which settled in the area after migrating from Northern Ireland. The sons of the family established a series of successful ship building firms in the second half of the 19th century and the area's name was taken from the nickname of 'Davistown'. The most successful of the shipwrights were the brothers Thomas, Rock and Edward Davis. Rock was born at sea aboard the Mary Catherine. Rock is named after the captain of the ship, Rock Jones.

Between 1869 and 1879, Ben Davis built an estimated 34 vessels at Davistown, and a further 15 at Bensville. Rock Davis built 8 vessels here between 1854 and 1862, and later moved to Blackwall (near Woy Woy), where he built at least 160 vessels between 1863 and 1904. Another local shipbuilder Alfred W.R.M. Settree built 7 vessels at Davistown, including Day Dawn, Edith Keep and Dewdrop, between 1869 and 1879. Giles Jenkins built 10 vessels, mostly ketches, at Davistown between 1876 and 1889.

Population
In the 2016 Census, there were 2,488 people in Davistown.  83.6% of people were born in Australia. The next most common country of birth was England at 4.5%. 93.8% of people only spoke English at home. The most common responses for religion in Davistown were Anglican 29.1%, No Religion 25.0% and Catholic 24.0%.

References

External links
 Davistown – A Brief History (Gosford City Library)

Suburbs of the Central Coast (New South Wales)